EEA or Eea may refer to:

Organisations
 European Economic Area
 European Environment Agency
 EEA Helicopter Operations, a Dutch subsidiary on CHC Helicopter

Economics
 Environmental-economic accounting
 Exchange Equalisation Account, the British Treasury's reserve fund

Science and technology
 Electron affinity (Eea), the energy required to detach an electron from a singly charged negative ion
 Equal environments assumption, an assumption underlying the methodology of the twin study
 Ethylene-ethyl acid, used in hot-melt adhesive
 Extended Euclidean algorithm

Other uses
 River Eea, in Cumbria, England
 Eëa, an island in Greek mythology
 Environment of evolutionary adaptedness, in evolutionary psychology
 Economic Espionage Act of 1996